The 1999–2000 FIG Artistic Gymnastics World Cup series was a series of stages where events in men's and women's artistic gymnastics were contested. The series was a two-year long competition culminating at a final event, the World Cup Final in 2000. A number of qualifier stages were held. The top 3 gymnast in each apparatus at the qualifier events would receive medals and prize money. Gymnasts who finished in the top 8 would also receive points that would be added up to a ranking which would qualify individual gymnasts for the biennial World Cup Final.

Stages

For the first time, the World Championships was part of the World Cup series. One extra event was held in December 2000, the Stuttgart World Cup, after the World Cup Final in Glasgow; this extra stage, however, was officially considered part of the 2001–2002 FIG Artistic Gymnastics World Cup series.

Medalists

Men

Women

Medal table

Overall

Men

Women

See also
 1999–2000 FIG Rhythmic Gymnastics World Cup series

References

Artistic Gymnastics World Cup
1999 in gymnastics
2000 in gymnastics